Onthophagus negligens, is a species of dung beetle found in India, and Sri Lanka.

Description
This oval, very convex species has an average length of about 5 to 6 mm. Body black or dark brown in color. Head and prothorax coppery. Intervals of each elytron are reddish-yellow. Antennae, mouthparts, pygidium and abdominal sides are yellowish. Dorsum and ventrum covered with pale setae. Head fairly short and broad with round clypeal margin. Pronotum densely and rugosely granular. Elytra finely striate with flat intervals and minute and sparse granules. Pygidium finely and sparsely punctured. Clypeus shiny with few large punctures.

References 

Scarabaeinae
Insects of India
Beetles of Sri Lanka
Beetles described in 1858